This page is about the Automatic Activation Device for parachutes. For the tree family, see Cupressaceae. For the Mediterranean island, see Cyprus. For the law doctrine, see Cy-près doctrine.

CYPRES is an acronym for Cybernetic Parachute Release System. It refers to a specific make and model of an automatic activation device (AAD), a device that automatically activates a parachute (typically as a reserve system for a skydiver) under certain circumstances. A CYPRES is designed to activate the reserve parachute at a preset altitude if the rate of descent is over a certain threshold. The manufacturer of the CYPRES is Airtec.

The CYPRES works by using a cutter to cut the reserve container closing loop. A spring-loaded pilot chute then leaves the container and breaks through the skydiver's slipstream to begin reserve deployment.

The CYPRES comes in five different models: Expert, Student, Tandem, Speed and Wingsuit. The basic operation of the units is the same; only the activation parameters are different, having been optimized for different types of skydiving.

References

External links 
 Airtec website
 CYPRES device website
 CYPRES 2 (newer model) device website

Parachuting

de:Öffnungsautomat#Airtec Cypres